In mathematics the Legendre rational functions are a sequence of orthogonal functions on [0, ∞). They are obtained by composing the Cayley transform with Legendre polynomials.

A rational Legendre function of degree n is defined as:

where  is a Legendre polynomial. These functions are eigenfunctions of the singular Sturm–Liouville problem:

with eigenvalues

Properties

Many properties can be derived from the properties of the Legendre polynomials of the first kind. Other properties are unique to the functions themselves.

Recursion 

and

Limiting behavior 

It can be shown that

and

Orthogonality 

where  is the Kronecker delta function.

Particular values

References 

Rational functions